Westie, or Westy may refer to:
 West Highland White Terrier, a breed of dog
 Westfield Sportscars
 Westie (person) or Westy, someone who comes from the Western suburbs of Auckland, New Zealand or Sydney, Australia
"Westy Gals", a single by Auckland singer Jan Hellriegel
 The Westies, an Irish American gang from New York City, United States
 The Westies, an Irish gang from Blanchardstown in Dublin, Ireland
 Westy, a suburban district in Warrington, England
 Rock of the Westies, an album by Elton John
 West Adelaide Football Club, an Australian rules football club from Adelaide, South Australia
 Westie, someone who dances the West coast swing
 Westies, a nickname for members of Principia College's Rackham Court West or Lowrey House
 The Westies, nickname for the Royal Westminster Regiment of the Canadian Forces
 Camper vans made by Westfalia, primarily based on Volkswagen vans

"Westy" is also a common nickname of people with the surname "West" or a similar name.

See also
Westi (Westinghouse Terminal Interactive), an early local teleprocessing package for IBM's DOS/VSE environment